The 2018 BNP Paribas de Nouvelle-Calédonie was a professional tennis tournament played on hard courts. It was the fifteenth edition of the tournament which was part of the 2018 ATP Challenger Tour. It took place in Nouméa, New Caledonia between 1–6 January 2018.

Singles main-draw entrants

Seeds

 1 Rankings are as of 25 December 2017.

Other entrants
The following players received wildcards into the singles main draw:
  Geoffrey Blancaneaux
  Julien Delaplane
  Maxime Janvier
  Loïc Perret

The following players received entry from the qualifying draw:
  Liam Caruana
  Alejandro González
  Zsombor Piros
  Tim Pütz

Champions

Singles

 Noah Rubin def.  Taylor Fritz 7–5, 6–4.

Doubles

 Hugo Nys /  Tim Pütz def.  Alejandro González /  Jaume Munar 6–2, 6–2.

External links
Official Website

2018 ATP Challenger Tour
2018
Inter
2018 in French tennis